Mohammed Rashed Al-Yamahi (Arabic:محمد راشد اليماحي) (born 18 January 1995) is an Emirati footballer. He plays as a defender, formerly for Dibba Al-Fujairah.

Career
Al-Yamahi started his career at Dibba Al-Fujairah and is a product of the Dibba Al-Fujairah's youth system. On 6 April 2018, Al Yamahi made his professional debut for Dibba Al-Fujairah against Al-Ain in the Pro League, replacing Ahmed Rashed Ali. landed with Dibba Al-Fujairah from the UAE Pro League to the UAE First Division League in 2018-19 season.

References

External links
 

1995 births
Living people
Emirati footballers
Dibba FC players
UAE Pro League players
Association football defenders
Place of birth missing (living people)